Mangelia subgracilenta is a species of sea snail, a marine gastropod mollusk in the family Mangeliidae.

Description

Distribution
This marine species occurs off Japan.

References

 Nomura, S., 1940: Mollusca dredged by the Husa-maru from the Pacific coast of Tiba Prefecture, Japan. Rec Oceanogr Works Japan 12(1): 81-116
 Organismnames.com: Mangelia subgracilenta

External links
  Tucker, J.K. 2004 Catalog of recent and fossil turrids (Mollusca: Gastropoda). Zootaxa 682:1-1295.
 

÷

subgracilenta
Gastropods described in 1940